Fears In the Water is the debut album by The Vincent Black Shadow, released on July 11, 2006, by Bodog.

Track listing

Personnel
Fears in the Water album personnel as listed on Allmusic.

The Vincent Black Shadow
Cassandra Ford -Vocals
 Chris Kirkham - bass,
 Robbie Kirkham - guitar
 Tony Kirkham - drums

Additional musicians
 Mary Ancheta - keyboards
 John Webster - keyboards, mixing, string arrangements
 Bruce Hamilton - pedal steel

Artwork and design
 Cassandra Ford - art direction
 Albert Normandin - photography

Production and recording
 Jason Darr - engineer, production
 Jay Evjen - assistant engineering
 Doug Fury - engineer
 Robbie Kirkham - Producer
 Eddy Schreyer - mastering

References

The Vincent Black Shadow albums
2006 albums